The medal table of the 2020 Summer Paralympics ranks the participating National Paralympic Committees (NPCs) by the number of gold medals that are won by their athletes during the competition. The 2020 Paralympics were the sixteenth Games to be held, a quadrennial competition open to athletes with physical and intellectual disabilities. The games were held in Tokyo, Japan from 24 August to 5 September 2021. There were 539 medal events.

Athletes from Costa Rica, Ecuador, El Salvador, Montenegro, and Oman won their first Paralympic medals. El Salvador and Oman had never won an Olympic medal. Costa Rica, Ecuador, Ethiopia, Pakistan, and Sri Lanka won their first Paralympic gold medals.

Medal table
Judo, table tennis and taekwondo award two bronze medals per discipline - the table tennis to losing semi-finalists,a first since the 1996 Summer Paralympics and the two combat sports by a repechage system whereby defeated athletes up to the semi-final stage rejoin competition for a bronze medal.

Two silver medals were awarded for a second-place tie in the men's high jump T47 athletics event. No bronze medal was awarded as a result.

Two bronze medals were awarded for a third-place tie in the men's 100 metres T64 athletics event.

Two bronze medals were awarded for a third-place tie in the women's 100 metre freestyle S7 swimming event.

Due to the disqualification of two participants, a bronze medal was not awarded in the women's 100 metres T11 athletics event.

Key

Podium sweeps

Changes
Marcin Polak was provisionally suspended from the men's individual pursuit B pending an adjudication following a positive test for a banned substance.

See also
 All-time Paralympic Games medal table
 2020 Summer Olympics medal table

References

External links
 Tokyo 2020 Official Homepage 

medal table
Summer Paralympics medal tables